Mill Lane may refer to:

 Mill Lane J I & EY School, Hanging Heaton, Batley, England
 Mill Lane, Cambridge, England
 Mill Lane Mill, Carbrooke, Norfolk, England
 Mill Lane, Hampshire in Hampshire, England

See also 
 
 Mill Road (disambiguation)
 Mill Street (disambiguation)